In Slavic mythology, vodyanoy or vodyanoi (lit. '[he] from the water' or 'watery') is a water spirit. In Czech and Slovak fairy tales, it is called vodník (or in Germanized form), and it is considered to be the equivalent creature as the Wassermann or nix of German fairy tales.

Vodyanoy is said to appear as a naked old man with a frog-like face, greenish beard, and long hair, with his body covered in algae and muck, usually covered in black fish scales; сonsequently, he is often dubbed "grandfather" or "forefather" by the local people. He has webbed paws instead of hands, a fish's tail, and eyes that burn like red-hot coals. He usually rides along his river on a half-sunken log, making loud splashes. Local drownings are said to be the work of the vodyanoy (or rusalkas).

When angered, the vodyanoy breaks dams, washes down water mills, and drowns people and animals. Consequently, fishermen, millers, and also bee-keepers make sacrifices to appease him. The vodyanoy would sometimes drag people down to his underwater dwelling to serve him as slaves.

In the Russian North, it is believed that vodyanoys have a ruler: the Tsar Vodyanik, or the Vodyan Tsar. He is described as an old man armed with a club, who can rise to the sky sitting on a black cloud and create new rivers and lakes.

Vodník in other folklores 

In Czech, Slovene, and Slovak folklore, the features of the vodník are markedly different from the East Slavic conception; he has a completely human constitution and habits, except for few differences – vodníci (plural of vodník) have gills, webbed membrane between their fingers, and their skin is algae-green in colour (as well as their hair, which is typically of pale green tone). Their overall dress and appearance is bizarre, sometimes even resembling a vagrant; patchy shirts and (by modern standards) odd hats — often boaters with long speckled ribbons — are commonplace. They can withstand lingering for hours outside their ponds. When they do so, one can easily discern them by their coattails, which are always dripping wet. The vodník's face is usually unshaven and it is not uncommon for a vodník to have a large, wet, tangled beard.

Czech, Slovenian and Slovak tales have both evil and good vodyanoys (relative to human beings) who do (or don't, respectively) try to drown people when they happen to swim in their territory. Vodníci would store the souls of the drowned in porcelain teapots. They consider their teapots their most valuable heritage and display their "work", using the number of teapots to represent their wealth and/or status among other vodníci. When the lid of such a pot is removed, the soul within (in the form of a bubble) will escape and be liberated. Except for fish (or perhaps fish spirits), they do not have servants. Otherwise, vodníci spend their time running their territory or – in their spare time – playing cards, smoking pipes or just sitting at the water surface (on rocks or willows nearby) and loitering. Fishermen ask the vodník for help by placing a pinch of tobacco in the water and saying, "Here's your tobacco, Lord Vodník, now give me a fish." In Czech, Slovak and Slovene tales vodníci live in ponds or rivers; there is no mention of a particular dwelling and the "half-sunken log" does not appear. There are almost no references to vodníci in connection with seawater, implying this would be dangerous or even deadly for them.

Companion spirits

Bolotnik 

Bolotnik is the owner of the swamp. He is often considered a relative of the vodyanoy and the leshy. There are many descriptions of him, but most often he was imagined as an old man with long green beard and his body covered in fish scales and algae. The bolotnik is dangerous, and he would pose an especially huge threat to those who play shepherd's pipe at night. In order to lure the person to the swamp, he would parody the sounds of various animals, create wandering lights and grow intoxicating plants. This spirit is often said to be a loner, although in some beliefs he has a wife, a bolotnitsa.

Vodyanitsa 
Vodyanitsa is a beautiful green-haired water maiden, and she is often said to be the wife of a vodyanoy. This spirit sometimes appears in the form of a golden-finned fish or a white swan. Vodyanitsy (plural) prefer forested lakes, mill ponds, wells and (less commonly) seas as their habitat. They are considered harmless spirits, although sometimes they tear the nets and spoil the millstones; the sea vodyanitsy are more aggressive than freshwater ones and are dangerous to ships. According to some beliefs, the main difference between the vodyanitsa and other water spirits is that she is a baptized drowned girl. The term is often used synonymously for rusalka.

Cultural references 

 The first Slovene ballad, written in 1826 by the Slovene national poet France Prešeren, was titled "The Water Man". It is about Urška, a flirt from Ljubljana, who ended up in the hands of a handsome man who turned out to be a vodyanoy. The poem is based on a story from The Glory of Carniola, about a dance at Old Square in Ljubljana in July 1547, when Urška Šefer was enchanted by a vodyanoy and tugged to the Ljubljanica. Prešeren wrote it due to his unfulfilled love towards Zalika Dolenc. In the first publication of the poem, the flirt was named Zalika.
 Composer Antonín Dvořák wrote a symphonic poem entitled Vodník (1896) about this creature, who is also a character in his opera Rusalka.
 Karel Jaromír Erben's poem 'Vodník' is the 9th poem of his 'Kytice' collection, and inspired Dvořák to compose the above-mentioned symphonic poem.
 The 1974 Czechoslovak comedy film about the end of vodníks in Bohemia, How to Drown Dr. Mracek, the Lawyer (Jak utopit dr. Mráčka aneb Konec vodníků v Čechách)
 David Wiltshire's novel Child of Vodyanoi (1978, adapted into the TV series The Nightmare Man) used the water spirit as a metaphor for a miniature Russian submarine.
 Vodyanoy is one of the best known characters of the Soviet cartoons. In the Soviet animated film The Flying Ship (1979), he sings about his loneliness and need to talk with someone.
 A vodyanoi named Hwiuur features in C. J. Cherryh's Russian novel trilogy, Rusalka (1989), Chernevog (1990), and Yvgenie (1991).
 In China Miéville's Bas-Lag novels, the Vodyanoi are an aquatic people skilled in water-based magic. In Miéville's Perdido Street Station (2000), Vodyanoi dockworkers go on strike and use their magic to blockade a river shipping route.
 An aging vodnik is the main character of the novel Hastrman by Czech writer Miloš Urban published in 2001. The novel won the Magnesia Litera prize for literature in 2002. A Czech movie based on the first part of the novel was produced in 2018.
 Vodnik is the main character in the 2013 thriller Croaker, written and directed by Pittsburgh area filmmaker Fred Terling.

 A Vodyanoy features early in Larry Correia's 2017 novel Monster Hunter Siege.
 A Vodník appeared as an antagonist in episode 3 of the animated Netflix series Legend Quest, where it terrorized a village by stealing the souls of children.

 A Vodyanoy is a spirit partner to a Russian shaman named Zria Gagarik [Shaman King]

In games 
 The Vodyanoi appears as a monster in Dungeons & Dragons It is described as a variety of Umber hulk.
 The Witcher video game (2007), portrays a race of water creatures called the vodyanoi, also known as the Fishpeople. Drowners are also referred to as Vodniks.
 Vodyanoy appears as a playable dragon in the 2018 Nintendo game Dragalia Lost.
 A Water-attribute monster called the Vodianoi appears in the 2003 From Software game Lost Kingdoms II.
 A ship called Vodianoy entered Call of Duty: Warzone at the start of Season 2, bringing zombies to Warzone once more, and potentially hinting at the oncoming destruction of Gora Dam.

See also 
 Bolotnik 
 Topielec 
 Grindylow
 Kappa (folklore)
 Lazavik
 Merman
 Su iyesi

References 
Citations

Bibliography

 
 Dixon-Kennedy, Mike (1998). Encyclopedia of Russian and Slavic Myth and Legend. Santa Barbara, California: ABC-CLIO. pp. 304-305. .

External links 
 
 

Slavic legendary creatures
Slavic tutelary deities
Slavic paganism
Water spirits
Piscine and amphibian humanoids